Kolah Boz-e Gharbi Rural District is in the Central District of Mianeh County, East Azerbaijan province, Iran. At the National Census of 2006, its population was 5,121 in 1,020 households. There were 4,107 inhabitants in 1,051 households at the following census of 2011. At the most recent census of 2016, the population of the rural district was 3,553 in 1,006 households. The largest of its 17 villages was Qarah Tavaraq, with 841 people.

References 

Meyaneh County

Rural Districts of East Azerbaijan Province

Populated places in East Azerbaijan Province

Populated places in Meyaneh County